Baron Karol Otto Kniaziewicz (4 May 1762 in Assiten, Courland (now Asīte, Latvia) – 9 May 1842 in Paris) was a Polish general and political activist.

Karol attended the Knight School in Warsaw. He participated in the Polish-Russian war of 1792 and the Kościuszko Uprising in the rank of a Major-General in 1794. He distinguished himself during the Napoleonic Wars in the Polish Legions as commander of the 1st Legion. In 1799 he was appointed to the position of a Brigadier General. From 1799 until 1801 he organized and commanded the "Danube Legion" (Legia Naddunajska), he distinguished himself during the Battle of Hohenlinden.

Since 1812 Brigadier General in the Duchy of Warsaw. He participated in the Russian Campaign of 1812. In 1814 he left Poland for France. During the November Uprising in 1830–1831 he served as representative of the "Polish National Government" in Paris. In emigration Karol was politically tied with the "Hôtel Lambert" and Adam Jerzy Czartoryski. He was one of the co-founders of the Polish Library in Paris.

Awards
 Commander's Cross of the Virtuti Militari (17 November 1812)
 Chevalier of the Légion d'honneur

References 

1762 births
1842 deaths
Activists of the Great Emigration
Bibliophiles
Polish book and manuscript collectors
Barons of Poland
Chevaliers of the Légion d'honneur
Commanders of the Virtuti Militari
Generals of the Polish–Lithuanian Commonwealth
Kościuszko insurgents
People of the Polish–Russian War of 1792
Polish commanders of the Napoleonic Wars
Polish diplomats of November Uprising
Polish generals
Generals of the Polish Legions (Napoleonic period)
Polish politicians
Latvian emigrants to France
Names inscribed under the Arc de Triomphe